The 2018 Rallye Deutschland (formally known as the ADAC Rallye Deutschland 2018) was a motor racing event for rally cars held over four days between 16 and 19 August 2018. It marked the thirty-sixth running of Rallye Deutschland, and was the ninth round of the 2018 FIA World Rally Championship and its support categories, the WRC-2 and WRC-3 championships. The event was based at Sankt Wendel in the countryside surrounding the Bostalsee in Saarland, and consisted of eighteen special stages totalling  in competitive kilometres.

Ott Tänak and Martin Järveoja were the defending rally winners and they successfully defended their title. The Škoda Motorsport II crew of Jan Kopecký and Pavel Dresler won the World Rally Championship-2 category in a Škoda Fabia R5, while Finnish crew Taisko Lario and Tatu Hämäläinen won the World Rally Championship-3.

Background

Championship standings prior to the event
Thierry Neuville and Nicolas Gilsoul entered the round with a twenty-one-point lead in the World Championship for Drivers and Co-drivers. In the World Championship for Manufacturers, Hyundai Shell Mobis WRT held a twenty-six-point lead over M-Sport Ford WRT.

Entry list
The following crews were entered into the rally. The event was opened to crews competing in the World Rally Championship, World Rally Championship-2, and the World Rally Championship-3. The final entry list consisted of thirteen World Rally Car entries, nineteen entries in World Rally Championship-2, and three World Rally Championship-3 entries.

Report

Thursday
Ott Tänak, who won the Shakedown, topped his Yaris over the WRC 2 category leader Kalle Rovanperä by just one-tenth of a second, while the young Norwegian Ole Christian Veiby was another slender 0.1 second behind. Returned Dani Sordo cleared the stage in fourth, followed by another experienced WRC 2 driver Jan Kopecký. Defending world champion Sébastien Ogier finished in seventh, ahead of Andreas Mikkelsen and Craig Breen by 0.1 and 0.2 second respectively. Two WRC 2 drivers, Umberto Scandola and Kajetan Kajetanowicz completed the top ten.

Friday
Five-time world champion Sébastien Ogier was the fastest man to finish the day other than the defending rally winner Ott Tänak, who set five out of six fastest stage times and built a 12.3-second lead over the Frenchman, while championship leader Thierry Neuville was another 15.1 seconds behind. Elfyn Evans climbed up three places in the afternoon loop and edged Jari-Matti Latvala by a second. Dani Sordo completed the day in sixth, only one-tenth of a second ahead of Esapekka Lappi, who failed to come to terms with dirt dragged onto the roads by the early starters. Craig Breen lost some time due to being caught in a heavy rain shower in the early stage in the eighth place, followed by Andreas Mikkelsen, who was struggling with his i20's handling and chose to change his driving style, in ninth, only one second behind. Teemu Suninen, driving a third Fiesta, in tenth. Lacking of power caused Mads Østberg to fail to find the pace like Finland, which made him cleared the day off the leaderboard in eleventh overall.

Saturday

Saturday turned out to be a total disaster for Ford. First in the early stage, Elfyn Evans retired his Ford Fiesta from the day after sliding into a field, damaging the left front wheel in the process. Then in the afternoon loop, Second-place Sébastien Ogier suffered a puncture due to hitting a rock in the second pass through the marathon Panzerplatte military road test, dropping him five places to seventh overall, half a second behind Andreas Mikkelsen in front. This further extended Ott Tänak's lead to 43.7 seconds. This time over Dani Sordo, who edged Jari-Matti Latvala by just 0.8 second after a hot fight. Championship leader Thierry Neuville struggled for pace in his i20. He switched back to yesterday's differential and gearbox settings and found a comfortable rhythm. The Belgian eventually ended the day in fourth, eight seconds ahead of Esapekka Lappi. Teemu Suninen climbed up to eighth after Craig Breen crashed in the final stage and damaged his Citroën C3's rear left suspension and dropped down to tenth place, followed by Mads Østberg cleared the day in ninth after a trouble free day.

Sunday
The opening stage saw a dramatic start to final day of the event. Tenth-place Mads Østberg, who was third on road, went off into a field and forced to retire from the event. Dani Sordo and Jari-Matti Latvala should have a fierce competition for second place, but an accident damage, which is happened on the Spaniard，and a transmission failure, which is happened on the Finn, burned the battle to ash. The biggest beneficiary of the chaos is championship leader Thierry Neuville, who was pushed up to the second place after the two's retirement.

The king of the event is obviously Ott Tänak, who led the entire rally but one stage. The Estonian took his first back-to-back victory in his career and now eats the gap to top to thirty-six points in the drivers' championships. Teammate Esapekka Lappi finished third, 21.7 seconds behind Thierry Neuville. With a 1-3 finish, Toyota overtook Ford to second in the manufacturers' championships, only thirteen points behind Hyundai. Although defending world champion Sébastien Ogier won the Power Stage, the outcome of fourth place finish still failed to narrow the gap to championship leader Thierry Neuville — it is up to twenty-three points after the event. Teammate Teemu Suninen completed the rally with a fifth-place finish after a consistent weekend, followed by Andreas Mikkelsen in sixth. Craig Breen finished in seventh, while localman Marijan Griebel finished in eighth. WRC 2 leader Jan Kopecký and seventeen-year-old Kalle Rovanperä completed the leaderboard.

Classification

Top ten finishers
The following crews finished the rally in each class's top ten.

Other notable finishers
The following notable crews finished the rally outside top ten.

Special stages

Power stage
The Power stage was a 14.97 km stage at the end of the rally. Additional World Championship points were awarded to the five fastest crews.

Penalties
The following notable crews were given time penalty during the rally.

Retirements
The following notable crews retired from the event. Under Rally2 regulations, they were eligible to re-enter the event starting from the next leg. Crews that re-entered were given an additional time penalty.

Championship standings after the rally

Drivers' championships

Co-Drivers' championships

Manufacturers' and teams' championships

Notes

References

External links

  
 2018 Rallye Deutschland in e-wrc website
 The official website of the World Rally Championship

Deutschland
2018
2018 in German motorsport
August 2018 sports events in Germany